Eva Koťátková (born 1982 Prague) is a Czech installation artist and film maker.

Biography
Eva Koťátková was born on 1 September 1982 in Prague.

In 2007 Koťátková obtained her degree from the Academy of Fine Arts, Prague and went on the study at the Academy of Applied Arts in Prague as well as the San Francisco Art Institute. Her installation Asylum was included in the 2013 Venice Biennale. Her work was exhibited at the 2015 New Museum Triennial. Her work has also been shown at the Metropolitan Museum of Art, and the Kunsthal Charlottenborg. Her 2014 work, Untitled, is in the collection of the Museum of Modern Art.

In 2014 Koťátková was the recipient of the Dorothea von Stetten Art Award. She lives and works in Prague.

References

External links
images of Koťátková's work at hunt kastner

1982 births
Living people
21st-century Czech women artists
Artists from Prague
Czech contemporary artists
San Francisco Art Institute alumni
Academy of Arts, Architecture and Design in Prague alumni